is a district located in Wakayama Prefecture, Japan.

As of September 1, 2008, the district has an estimated Population of 42,840 and a Density of 98.9 persons/km2. The total area is 433.24 km2.

Towns and villages
Kamitonda
Shirahama
Susami

Merger
On April 1, 2005 the town of Kushimoto merged with the town of Koza, from Higashimuro District, to form the new town of Kushimoto, now part of Higashimuro District.
On May 1, 2005 the town of Nakahechi, and the village of Ōtō merged into the city of Tanabe.
On March 1, 2006 the town of Hikigawa merged into the town of Shirahama.

Districts in Wakayama Prefecture